Advanced Electronics Company (AEC) is a limited liability company in Saudi Arabia that was established in 1988 under the Economic Offset Program as per the directives of the government of Saudi Arabia. AEC is a regional organization specializing in the field of modern electronics.

Acquisition by Saudi Arabian Military Industries 
In December 2020, the Saudi Arabian Military Industries (SAMI) fully acquired AEC, making it a 100% Saudi-owned company. The deal shall strengthen SAMI's presence in the defense industries market. It is the largest military industries deal ever concluded in Saudi Arabia.

In 2021, Ziad bin Houmod Al-Musallam was appointed the CEO of AEC.

See also
 Prince Sultan Advanced Technology Research Institute - a Saudi defense research and development partner.

References

Electronics companies established in 1988
Companies based in Riyadh
Electronics companies of Saudi Arabia
Defence companies of Saudi Arabia
Saudi Arabian companies established in 1988